Nanjupuram is a 2011 Tamil horror film directed by Charles, starring Raaghav and Monica in the lead roles, while Thambi Ramaiah and Naren Narayanan play supporting roles. The film, which features music scored by Raaghav himself, was produced by his wife Preetha. The film was in production for over three years and was finally released on 1 April 2011 and got positive Word of mouth from B&C centers and became a Sleeper hit.

Plot
Nanjupuram is a small village surrounded by hills full of poisonous snakes. The village has two big shots. One is the president of the village (Thambi Ramaiah), and the other one is a good guy having a son named Velu (Raaghav). The president has an affair with Malar's (Monica) mother, and he often comes to Malar's house.

One day, while treating a snake-bitten girl from the village, the unafraid Velu takes her to the opposite side of the hill, across the snakes. Malar also accompanies him. After getting treatment, Malar and Velu fall in love with each other. One day, when Malar is taking a bath with her friends in the river, a snake comes to attack her. Just then, Velu arrives and stamps the snake. The snake is brutally injured in its neck. The snake then slithers off, leaving Velu's parents and others struck in fear, as hurt snakes would revenge the assaulter by killing them within 40 days of the attack. They build Velu a hut above 30 feet with dug land beneath it, but Velu often gets down and goes to the riverside during the night to meet Malar when the guards are asleep.

One day, Velu's father finds about this and asks the president to warn Malar. The president goes to her house and threatens Malar and her mother to see a bridegroom for Malar quickly. They arrange her marriage, but Malar is not happy with this. At the same time, Velu is threatened with the return of the same snake trying to kill him, so he does not go to meet Malar in the banks. One day when Malar's engagement is also over, she asks Velu's friend, a thief, to speak to him and ask him to come and meet her. The thief tells Velu that Malar is waiting for him and that the snake's return and all is just a fear. Velu strengthens his heart and goes for Malar when the thief distracts the guards and makes them chase him. Velu and Malar decide to go out of the village to get married.

Just then, the snake comes and chases them. At the time, the villagers find out their escape and search for them around the village. When the snake was about to kill Velu, the sun rises, marking the end of the 40th day; thus, the snake goes away. Unfortunately, the president and his henchmen find out Malar and try to kill her. Velu shields her but gets attacked and dies. After Velu's death, Malar bears his child and gives birth to it. The film closes with Velu's little son playing with snakes, just like his dead father.

Cast
Raaghav as Velu
Monica as Malar
Thambi Ramiah as Village President
 Naren Narayanan as Velu's father
Priya
Anuya Bhagvath in a special appearance

Soundtrack 
Soundtrack was composed by Raghav.
"The Warriors Rap" – Raaghav 
"Thelaga Kottudhamma" – Archith, Preetha. S 
"Oorula Unakkoru Medai" – Pushpavanam Kuppuswamy 
"Yaavarum" – Preetha. S 
"Anbe Unna" – JSK Sruthi, Kavitha 
"Yennatuma Vaanathula" – Raaghav

Critical reception
Behindwoods wrote "What work against the movie are the rusty story and the plot. Having decided to put across a message with his movie, Charles had taken up a plot mired with logical loopholes." Indiaglitz wrote "Unfortunately, the script misses some novelty. Had Charles blended more of it and reduced cliches, `Nanjupuram' would have been different". Indian Express wrote "With a small budget, little-known actors and a debutant director at the helm, the film delivers much more than what one might expect."

References

2011 films
2011 thriller drama films
2010s Tamil-language films
2011 drama films
Indian thriller drama films